Zindagi is a 1978 Pakistani Urdu film. It was a platinum jubilee hit directed by Nazar-ul-Islam and screenplay by Bashir Niaz. The cast included Babra Sharif, Nadeem, Mustafa Qureshi, Talish, and Tariq Aziz. The music was composed by M. Ashraf and lyrics by Kaleem Usmani with hit tracks like, "Tere sung dosti hum na chorrein kabhi" and "Jungle mein mangle tere hi dum se". Zindagi received a Nigar Award in the best lyricist category.

Plot
A law-abiding citizen risks his life and family fighting against a criminal gang for the betterment of society.

Cast
 Babra Sharif
 Nadeem
 Mustafa Qureshi
 Talish
 Nanha
 Sabiha Khanum
 Tariq Aziz
 Kemal Irani
 Saqi

Production
Zindagi was produced by Ahmed Shamsi, directed by Nazar-ul-Islam and written by Bashir Niaz. It was partly filmed in Bangkok.

Soundtracks
Music composer: M. Ashraf, Lyricist: Kaleem Usmani
 Janay Kya Ho Geya Hay ... Singer(s): Ghulam Abbas, Mehnaz
 Jungle Mein Mangal Teray Hi Dam Say ... Singer(s): Mehnaz, A Nayyar
 Teray Sung Dosti, Ham Na Chhoren Kabhi ... Singer(s): Mehdi Hassan, Mehnaz
 Teray Sung Dosti, Ham Na Chhoren Kabhi ... Singer(s): A. Nayyar, Mehnaz
 Tujhay Dil Mein Basa Lun, Dharkan Mein Chhupa Lun ... Singer(s): Mehnaz

Box office
Zindagi was released on 29 September 1978. It completed 88 weeks at main theaters and crowned as a platinum jubilee hit.

Awards
Zindagi won a Nigar Award for the category of best lyricist (Kaleem Usmani).

References

1978 films
Films shot in Bangkok
1970s Urdu-language films
Nigar Award winners
Pakistani action drama films
Pakistani crime action films
Urdu-language Pakistani films